Castro Barros is a department of the province of La Rioja (Argentina).

References 

La Rioja Province, Argentina